The Khanzada   or Khan Zadeh are a community of Muslim Rajputs Mev found in the Awadh region of Uttar Pradesh, India. This community is distinct from the Rajasthani Khanzada Rajput Mev, the descendants of Wali-e-Mewat Raja Naher Khan, who are a sub-clan of Jadaun gotra. They are also a community of Muslim Rajputs. They refer to themselves as Musalman Rajputs Mev. After the Partition of India in 1947, many members of this community migrated to Pakistan.

History and origin
The word Khanzada in Persian means son of a khan, or king. This has literally the same meaning as the word Rajput, which also means son of a king in Sanskrit.  Each Khanzada clan has its own tradition as to when they converted to Islam. 

The community that claims to be the first to convert to Islam are the Dikhit Khanzada of Banda District, who are said to have been converted at the hands of Mohammad Ghori, some eight centuries ago, and calls themselves Ghori Dikhit. Other clans, such as the Yaduvanshi Rajputs of Mewat State are said to have converted during the rule of Firuz Shah Tughlaq in 1355 are known as Khanzadas of Mewat. The Gorwal Gotra of Meo Rajput is a branch of Khanzada Rajput of Mewat, Similarly Bisen of Barabanki District are said to have converted during the rule of Firuz Shah Tughlaq. The most famous Bisen Khanzada family is said of the taluqdars of Usmanpur in Barabanki District. This estate was founded by one Kaunsal Singh (also known as Raja Khushhal Singh), who obtained an estate as a reward for military service against Bhar Tribe in the district. One of his sons Lakhan Singh converted to Islam, and took the name Lakhu Khan. The estate of Usmanpur was founded by Ghanzafar Khan, who was confirmed ownership of Usmanpur and neighbouring villages by the Nawabs of Awadh. Chandel of Hardoi District are said to have converted during the rule of Sher Shah Suri.  Over time, a number of other Rajput clans in what is now eastern Uttar Pradesh also converted to Islam. Many of these Rajput converts were granted estates or talukas, and estate holders were referred to as taluqdars. The history of the Awadh region is in many ways the history of the various taluqdar families, and their struggle with both the Mughals and then the Nawabs of Awadh. While taluqdars formed as special social class, the bulk of the Khanzada remained a community of peasant proprietors. Included among the Khanzada were immigrants Rajput clans from the Punjab, such as Johiya of Chail, the Khokhar of Kot and Bhatti of Yahiapur. In Pratapgarh District, the Khanzadas included representatives of several well known Rajput tribes such as the Bisen, Rajkumar, Bachgoti, Bhale Sultan, Sombansi, Bais, Kanhpuriya, Bharsaiyan, Mandarkia and Bilkharya. Traditionally the Bilkhariya and Bhale Sultan Khanzada are endogamous, while other groups are exogamous. The Mandarkia and Bharsaiyan are both strictly endogamous groupings, and as such differ from other Khanzada groupings who follow the custom of clan exogamy.
The term khanzada originally applied to the Bachgoti Rajput family of the Rajahs of Hasanpur. They were said to have converted to Islam during the rule of Sher Shah Suri. This family claimed descent from Bariar Singh, a Bachgoti Rajput, who said to have emigrated from Sultanpur in the 13th century. The Bachgoti had started off as a clan of the Chauhan Rajputs of Mainpuri. Bariar Singh's grandson, Tilok Chand is said to have converted to Islam, and the family took the name khanzada.

The Mandarkia and Bharsaiyan are both strictly endogamous groupings, and as such differ from other Khanzada groupings who follow the custom of clan exogamy.

From the middle of the 19th century, the term Khanzada was extended to refer to all those Rajput clans, who had converted to Islam in Awadh and neighbouring Benaras division.  The term is now used in the same manner as the term Ranghar, which refers to any Muslim Rajput in western Uttar Pradesh, and Khanzada is now used to describe any of the Muslim Rajput clans of eastern Uttar Pradesh. In addition, the Muslim Bhumihar of Ghazipur District are also included within the Khanzada category.

Present circumstances
In northern Awadh, a region comprising roughly Barabanki District in south east to Lakhimpur Kheri District in the north west, the Khanzada have a followed a slightly different path, with a stronger identification with Islam. In a recent study of a Chauhan Khanzada village in Raisenghat Tehsil of Barabanki District, this particular community was seen to be strongly identifying with neighbouring Pathan communities, and there was increasingly intermarriage between the two groups. There economic condition in this region is also been affected, with a dwindling in the size of their farms, especially in Shravasti and Balrampur districts. Many are now, in fact, landless agricultural labourers.

The Khanzada, however have been badly affected by abolition of the zamindari system, with many now destitute. They still remain a land owning community, but those especially in Balrampur, Gonda and Bahraich are now simply agricultural labourers. The community are also divided on sectarian lines, with the majority being Sunni, while a minority, mainly the ex-taluqdar families being Shia. Like other Indian Muslims, there is growing movement towards orthodoxy, with many of their villages containing madrasas. The madrasas have also facilitated the growth of Urdu, with it beginning to replace the Awadhi dialect they traditionally spoke.

See also
 Bhatti Khanzada
 Khokhar Khanzada

References

Further reading

Khanzada
Rajput clans of Rajasthan
Rajput clans of Uttar Pradesh
Muhajir communities
Rajput clans
Muslim communities of Uttar Pradesh
Muslim communities of Bihar